Donacarney ( or ) is a village in the area known as East Meath in County Meath, Ireland, close to Drogheda and the border with County Louth. It contains one church, two estates, two schools, and one pub. Although it includes the townlands of Donacarney Great and Donacarney Little, most locals would never use those terms in describing Donacarney.  The remains of a late-medieval tower house (see picture to right) is sited close to Donacarney Cross. It is described in the Civil Survey (1654–56) as 'an ould Castle'. It appears in this state on a map of 1771. Blackhills Crescent, Donacarney, takes its name from the area known as the Black Hills or Black Hill Lands north of the crossroads and the castle, the old name of which was Croc a' Searra in Irish.

For census purposes, Donacarney is combined with a number of other local towns to form the census town of Laytown-Bettystown-Mornington-Donacarney, with a total population of 11,872 at the 2016 Census.

Schools
Donacarney contains two schools: One boys school and a girls school. Roughly 600 pupils attend both schools. The schools share the same campus. The name of the school is Réalt ná Mara B.N.S and Réalt ná Mara G.N.S respectively. The old school hall, which was replaced by the current schools in 1965, was originally opened in 1873. The red-bricked building, beside the forge and old village water-pump at Donacarney cross, now serves as a community centre. It is also used as the local polling centre in elections. The school was given planning permission for a new school in 2012.

Religion
There is one Roman Catholic church close to Donacarney in the adjoining townland of  Mornington. It is called Star of the Sea Church. It is also called Mornington Church, and serves the half-parish of Mornington, part of the Laytown-Mornington parish created in 1986, which includes Donacarney.

History
Donacarney, or Duuenacharny, was recorded as part of Mornington in a 'Charter of Walter de Lacy reciting and confirming a grant made by Hugh his father of various churches & lands in Ireland’ in 1230–1234. Thereafter it became part of the manor of Colpe throughout the medieval period. It was in the possession of the Augustinian Abbey at Colp, (a cell of Llanthony Priory in Monmouthshire) but held and run separate from the manor by a tenant. At the Suppression of the Monasteries in 1536 in became part of the estates of Henry Draycott. The ruins of the late-medieval tower house was known as ‘Draycott’s Castle’ and is thought to have been burnt in 1641.

References 

Towns and villages in County Meath